Hele, Hélé, or Hèle may refer to:

Places 
in England
in Cornwall
Hele, Cornwall, a village near Bude, Cornwall
in Devon
Hele, Devon, a village near Bradninch in Mid Devon
Hele, North Devon, a village near Ilfracombe
Hele Bay
Hele, Teignbridge, a hamlet near Ashburton
Hele, Torquay, an area of the town of Torquay
Hele, Torridge, a hamlet in the far west of Devon
South Hele, Devon, a hamlet near South Brent
Croker's Hele, Meeth, an historic estate
in Somerset
Hele, Somerset, a village near Taunton
in China
 Hele, Hainan, a township-level division in Hainan
 Hele Railway Station, on the Hainan Eastern Ring Railway in Hainan
in Greece
 Hele (Laconia), a town of ancient Laconia

People
as a first name
 Hele Everaus (born 1953), Estonian medical scientist, physician and politician
 Hele Kõrve (born 1980), Estonian actress and singer
 Hele-Mall Pajumägi (born 1938), Estonian badminton player and coach

as a surname
 Andrew Hele (born 1967), English cricketer
 Doug Hele (1919–2001), English motorcycle engineer
 Elize Hele (1560–1635), English lawyer and philanthropist
 George Hele (1891–1982), Australian cricket umpire
 George de La Hèle (1547–1586), Franco-Flemish composer
 Henry Hele (c. 1688–1778), English physician and land owner
 Ivor Hele (1912–1993), Australian artist
 John Hele (disambiguation), several people
 Pierre Hélé (born 1946), Cameroonian politician
 Sampson Hele (1582–1655), English politician
 Thomas Hele (disambiguation), several people
 Warwick Hele (1568–1626), English politician and landowner

Other uses
 Hele & Co, a firm of English organ-makers between 1865 and 2007
 The Hele baronets, an extinct title in the Baronetage of England
 Hele's School, a secondary school in Plymouth, England
 Hele's School, Exeter, a former boys' grammar school in Devon, England

See also 
Heale
Heal (disambiguation)
Heel (disambiguation)

Estonian feminine given names